An electronic navigational chart (ENC) is an official database created by a national hydrographic office for use with an Electronic Chart Display and Information System (ECDIS). 

Inland Electronic Chart Display and Information System are similar systems used for navigation of inland water.

ENC
An electronic chart must conform to standards stated in the International Hydrographic Organization (IHO) Publication S-57 before it can be certified as an ENC. Only ENCs can be used within ECDIS to meet the International Maritime Organization (IMO) performance standard for ECDIS.

ENCs are available for wholesale distribution to chart agents and resellers from Regional Electronic Navigational Chart Centres (RENCs). The RENCs are not-for-profit organizations made up of ENC-producer countries.  RENCs independently check each ENC submitted by the contributing countries to ensure that they conform to the relevant IHO standards.  The RENCs also act collectively as one-stop wholesalers of most of the world's ENCs.

IHO Publication S-63 developed by the IHO Data Protection Scheme Working Group is used to encrypt and digitally sign ENC data. Chart data is captured based on standards stated in IHO Publication S-57, and is displayed according to a display standard set out in IHO Publication S-52 to ensure consistency of data rendering between different systems.

IMO adopted compulsory carriage of ECDIS and ENCs on new high speed craft from 1 July 2010 and progressively for other craft from 2012 to 2018.

ECDIS
An Electronic Chart Display and Information System (ECDIS) is a geographic information system used for nautical navigation that complies with International Maritime Organization (IMO) regulations as an alternative to paper nautical charts. IMO refers to similar systems not meeting the regulations as Electronic Chart Systems (ECSs).

An ECDIS system displays the information from Electronic Navigational Charts (ENC) and integrates position information from position, heading and speed through water reference systems and optionally other navigational sensors. Other sensors which could interface with an ECDIS are radar, Navtex, Automatic Identification Systems (AIS), and depth sounders.

In recent years concerns from the industry have been raised as to the system's security especially with regards to cyber attacks and GPS spoofing attacks.

ECDIS provides continuous position and navigational safety information. The system generates audible and/or visual alarms when the vessel is in proximity to navigational hazards. Military versions of ECDIS are known as WECDIS (warship ECDIS) or ECDIS-N (ECDIS-naval).

Regulations
ECDIS (as defined by IHO Publications S-57 and S-52) is an approved marine navigational chart and information system, which is accepted as complying with the conventional paper charts required by Regulation V/19 of the 1974 IMO SOLAS Convention. as amended. The performance requirements for ECDIS are defined by IMO and the consequent test standards have been developed by the International Electrotechnical Commission (IEC) in International Standard IEC 61174.

In the future, the ENC will be part of a product specification family which is based on the "IHO Universal Hydrographic Data Model", known as S-100. The product specification number S-101 has been assigned to the ENC.

See also
 e-Navigation concept
 Raster Navigational Charts (NOAA)
 Navionics
 C-MAP

References

Further reading
 WEINTRIT Adam: The Electronic Chart Display and Information System (ECDIS). An Operational Handbook. A Balkema Book. CRC Press, Taylor & Francis Group, Boca Raton – London - New York - Leiden, 2009., http://www.crcpress.com/product/isbn/9780415482462

External links
IMO Electronic Chart Overview
Transas Electronic Navigational Charts, World Folio
International Centre for ENCs, one of two RENCs in the world
PRIMAR, one of two RENCs in the world
United Kingdom Hydrographic Office
Electronic Chart Centre (ECC)
Product Survey ECDIS - ECS+ software
Office of Coast Survey, has free download of ENCs for US.
Inland Electronic Navigation Charts (US)
Open Electronic Navigation Charts Directory
NOAA ENC Chart Viewer

Electronic navigation
Navigational aids
Nautical charts